Lord Arthur Charles Hervey (20 August 1808 – 9 June 1894) was an English bishop who served as Bishop of Bath and Wells from 1869 to 1894. He was usually known by his aristocratic courtesy title, "Lord", rather than the style appropriate to a bishop, the Right Reverend.

Background and education
Hervey was the fourth son of Frederick Hervey, 1st Marquess of Bristol, by Elizabeth Albana Upton, daughter of Clotworthy Upton, 1st Baron Templetown. His paternal grandfather was Frederick Hervey, 4th Earl of Bristol, the Bishop of Derry. He was born at his father's London house, 6 St James's Square, on 20 August 1808. From 1817 to 1822, he lived abroad with his parents, chiefly in Paris, and was taught by a private tutor. He entered Eton College in 1822 and remained there until 1826. He entered Trinity College, Cambridge, in 1827, and after a residence of two years and a half, obtained a first class in the classical tripos and graduated B.A. in 1830.

Career
Having been ordained both deacon and priest in October 1832, Hervey was instituted in November to the small family living of Ickworth-cum-Chedburgh, Suffolk, with which he was associated until 1869. Chedburgh, being in 1844 separated from Ickworth and joined to Horningsheath or Horringer, he also became curate of Horringer until in 1856 he was instituted to the rectory which he held with Ickworth. He was active in clerical work, took a leading part in the organisation of educational institutions in Bury St. Edmunds such as the  Bury and West Suffolk Archaeological Institute of which he was the President. He seems to have been the first to propose a system of university extension. In 1862 he was appointed archdeacon of Sudbury.

On the resignation of Lord Auckland, Bishop of Bath and Wells, in 1869, he was offered the bishopric on the recommendation of William Ewart Gladstone, and was consecrated on 21 December. He remained in the post until his death in 1894. He was a moderate evangelical.

Works
Hervey was a good linguist, and wrote some antiquarian papers. He was one of the committee of revisers of the Authorised Version of the Old Testament, which sat 1870–1884, and in 1885 received the honorary degree of D.D. from the university of Oxford in recognition of his services. He contributed largely to William Smith's Dictionary of the Bible and to the Speaker's Commentary. Besides sermons and lectures, charges and pamphlets, he was author of The Genealogies of our Lord (1853).

Family

Hervey married Patience Singleton, daughter of John Singleton (born Fowke), of Hacely, Hampshire, and Mell, County Louth, on 30 July 1839. They had twelve children, of whom five sons and three daughters survived him. He died in Hackwood, near Basingstoke, the house of his son-in-law, C. Hoare, on 9 June 1894 in his eighty-sixth year and was buried in Wells.

In the 1870s, one of Hervey's daughters trained the mute swans in the five sided moat at the Bishops Palace to ring bells, by pulling strings, to beg for food.

Notes

External links

Bibliographic directory from Project Canterbury

1808 births
1894 deaths
Bishops of Bath and Wells
Archdeacons of Sudbury
People educated at Eton College
Alumni of Trinity College, Cambridge
Younger sons of marquesses
Arthur
Burials at Wells Cathedral
People from the Borough of St Edmundsbury